The music of the Scream series consists of the soundtracks to the Scream franchise, which have been released in several soundtrack albums. American composer Marco Beltrami composed the film scores for the first four films in the series, while Brian Tyler has composed the series since.

Scream (1996)

Soundtrack 

The original soundtrack for Scream was released on December 17, 1996, by TVT Records. The soundtrack features 11 songs—most of which appeared in various scenes in the film—plus a piece from the film's score, "Trouble in Woodsboro" / "Sidney's Lament", by Beltrami. The Alice Cooper version of "School's Out" appeared in the film following the closure of Woodsboro high school, but it was replaced with a cover version of the song by The Last Hard Men on the album. An acoustic cover of Blue Öyster Cult's "Don't Fear the Reaper", performed by Gus Black, plays softly in the background while Sidney and Billy discuss their relationship. The song was also one of the few songs featured in John Carpenter's Halloween, a film to which Scream makes repeated homage. Analyst Jeff Smith describes the musical choice as: 

The song "Red Right Hand" by Nick Cave and the Bad Seeds, heard in the first film, is also used in Scream 2, Scream 3 and Scream (2022). Nick Cave performs a version of the track written specifically for Scream 3 in that film. An alternate version of the music video "Drop Dead Gorgeous" by Republica, featuring clips from the film, was shown on music networks such as MTV. Although the song can be heard in the film, it is only included in the European edition of the soundtrack album. The song was also used in one of the film's television commercials. The soundtrack album was not considered a success, failing to chart on the US Billboard 200. AllMusic awarded the album 3 stars out of 5.

Film score 
The Scream score by Marco Beltrami was released by Varèse Sarabande on July 14, 1998, on a CD titled "Scream/Scream 2", which also contained tracks from the score of Scream 2. The release consisted of only six tracks—"Sidney's Lament", "Altered Ego", "A Cruel World", "Trouble in Woodsboro", "Chasing Sidney", and "NC-17"—with a runtime of only 12 minutes, compared to over an hour of music made for the film and the more common 30–45 minutes of music found in other original scores. Some reviewers felt the restricted runtime was a result of the high cost of releasing a composer's music commercially, combined with Varèse Sarabande's unwillingness to pay.

The score to Scream received generally positive reviews, with Mikael Carlsson labeling it as "some of the most intriguing horror scores composed in years". Filmtracks.com claimed the scores had "cult status", awarding it 3 stars out of 5. AllMusic said that the score "perfectly captured the post-modern, hip scare-ride of the Scream movies", also giving it 3 stars out of 5.

Scream 2 (1997)

The original soundtrack for Scream 2 was released November 18, 1997, by Capitol Records, a division of EMI. The soundtrack consists of 15 songs by various artists from the R&B, Rap and Rock genres, all but two of which - "One More Chance" and "The Race" - appear in the film. The album spent ten weeks on the Billboard 200, rising as high as #50, performing significantly better than the Scream original soundtrack which never charted. Music guide AllMusic however scored the album lower than its predecessor. AllMusic's Stephen Erlewine was highly critical of the album, believing the content was an attempt to compensate for the previous film's lack of a hit soundtrack, but the attempt had failed, creating an "uneven" album of songs not "good enough to make [the artists'] own albums", awarding it only 2 stars out of 5.  Only one song featured in the film did not appear on the album, the original work, "Take Away the Fear", written and performed by Craven's own daughter Jessica Craven and Mike Mancini, which plays on a TV during an early scene in a sorority house involving Sarah Michelle Gellar. On February 4, 1998 Scream 2: Music from the Dimension Motion Picture was certified gold by the Recording Industry Association of America, signifying that the album achieved sales in excess of 500,000 units.

Score 
The Scream 2 original score was, as in Scream, developed by Marco Beltrami and was released on July 14, 1998, by Varèse Sarabande on a CD which also contained tracks from the score of Scream entitled "Scream/Scream 2". The commercially released score for both films was found to be lacking many pieces heard in either film, consisting of only nine tracks – "Stage Fright Requiem", "Love Turns Sour", "Cici Creepies", "Deputy for a Friend", "Hollow Parting", "Dewpoint/Stabbed", "Hairtrigger Lunatic", "Sundown Search" and "It's Over, Sid" – with a runtime of only 17 minutes, compared to nearly 90 minutes of score developed for the film and the more common 30–45 minutes of music found in other original scores.  The release was also found to be missing the track "Cassandra Aria" by Danny Elfman, described by soundtrack-review site Filmtracks as "a frenzied, choral-enhanced three minutes".  The length of the released score was considered disappointing with some reviews considering the track omissions the result of the high fees required to be paid to composers in order to release their music commercially.

The influence of several other famous composers could be heard in the score including Hans Zimmer, Elliot Goldenthal, Ennio Morricone and Christopher Young. In particular excerpts of the Hans Zimmer's score to Broken Arrow, particularly the tracks "Brothers" and "Secure", featuring guitar work by Duane Eddy, would become a component of the theme tune of the character Dewey Riley. Filmtracks was complimentary to the score, appreciating Beltrami's evolution of his work in Scream but remarked that the most memorable music of the film would be from other composers, Elfman's contribution "Cassandra Aria" and the samples from Zimmer's score, finding the replacement of Beltrami's work for the Dewey character with Zimmer's work "effective". Ultimately, the album was called unsatisfying without Elfman's piece but better than the score for the first movie and it was awarded 3 stars out of 5. The music guide AllMusic was more complimentary of Beltrami's contribution, saying the score "perfectly captured the post-modern, hip scare-ride of the Scream movies", and awarded it 3 stars out of 5.

The Scream 2 original soundtrack was released December 2, 1997, by Capitol Records featuring 15 songs in the R&B, rap and rock genres by various artists, some of which are represented in the film. The album spent ten weeks on the Billboard 200, rising as high as No. 50 but received a lower score than its predecessor from the music guide Allmusic, gaining only 2 out of 5. Stephen Erlewine of Allmusic opined that the soundtrack was an attempt to compensate for the previous film's lack of a hit soundtrack, but failed to do, creating an "uneven" album of songs not "good enough to make [the artists'] own albums".

The Scream 2 score was, as in Scream, developed by Marco Beltrami and was released on July 14, 1998, in a dual-pack with the score to Scream by Varèse Sarabande. The commercially released score was found to be lacking several pieces used in the film, with a runtime of only 17 minutes compared to the more common 30–45 minutes normally found in original scores. Included in the missing pieces was the track "Cassandra Aria" created by Danny Elfman, described by soundtrack-review site Filmtracks as "a frenzied, choral-enhanced three minutes" that remains unreleased . The length of the released score was considered disappointing and blamed on the fees required to be paid to musicians in order to release their music. The influence of several other famous composers could be heard in the score including Hans Zimmer, Elliot Goldenthal, Ennio Morricone and Christopher Young. In particular excerpts of the Hans Zimmer's score to Broken Arrow, featuring guitar by Duane Eddy, would become a component of the theme tune of the character Dewey Riley.

Scream 3 (2000)

Scream 3: The Album is the original soundtrack album to the film Scream 3. Released on January 25, 2000, by Wind-up Records, the album features 18 songs consisting largely of the metal genre by artists such as System of a Down, Slipknot, Powerman 5000, Full Devil Jacket, Godsmack, Sevendust, Incubus, Static-X and Coal Chamber, some of which are represented in the film. The Nick Cave and the Bad Seeds song "Red Right Hand" is played in the film, having been heard in all three films. Nick Cave wrote a "sequel" to the song just for the film, which can be heard in the closing credits. This song was later included in The Seeds' B-Sides & Rarities album. Additionally, Marco Beltrami uses a few notes from the song in his score.

Also, the Creed song "What If" features a music video which resembles the happenings of the movie, and includes a cameo by David Arquette. The video can be seen in the DVD release of the movie. Creed also recorded the song "Is This the End" just for the film and can also be heard in the closing credits. On February 23, 2000, Scream 3: The Album was certified gold by the Recording Industry Association of America, signifying that the album achieved sales in excess of 500,000 units. The album fared better than its predecessors, spending 14 weeks on the Billboard 200 and reaching a top rank of number 32. It scored a 2.5 out of 5 from music guide AllMusic. Reviewer Steve Huey said that the "high pedigree" of the album's contributors had produced a "pretty listenable album".

The album was released on iTunes on February 1, 2012.

The Scream 3 original soundtrack was released on January 25, 2000, by Wind-up Records featuring 18 songs consisting largely of the metal genre by artists such as System of a Down and Powerman 5000, some of which are represented in the film. The album fared better than its predecessors, spending fourteen weeks on the Billboard 200 and reaching a top rank of #32. and scoring a 2.5 out of 5 from music guide Allmusic. Reviewer Steve Huey claims that the "high pedigree" of the albums contributors had produced a "pretty listenable album".

The Scream 3 score was again helmed by Marco Beltrami who employed seven orchestrators and experimented with the recording of instruments in unusual circumstances such as physically and electronically altering the traditional sound of a piano while continuing to include a heavy vocal orchestra in his tracks There was consideration that Beltrami was forced to hire multiple orchestrators to complete the score to meet the film's deadline. Like previous scores in the series, the Scream 3 score was released by Varèse Sarabande on February 29, 2000, with a total length of 33 minutes of music, though the album was again found to be missing certain sections of the score utilized within the film. Beltrami took inspiration from other composers for the score, again incorporating excerpts of the score to Broken Arrow by Hans Zimmer in the track "Sid Wears a Dress". Music guide Allmusic awarded the Scream 3 score 2.5 out of 5.

Scream 4 (2011)

The original soundtrack for Scream 4 was released on April 12, 2011, by Lakeshore Records. A score soundtrack was also released, on April 19, 2011, by Varèse Sarabande.

The Scream 4: Original Motion Picture Soundtrack was released on April 12, 2011, by Lakeshore Records. The soundtrack features 12 songs performed by various artists mainly of the rock genre, such as Ida Maria, The Sounds and The Novocaines. The soundtrack received mixed reactions, with Gotham News stating that "This new album attempts to retain the style of the old, while speaking to the present content-diluted market. It has some success, but no cigar." Shadowlocked criticized the soundtrack's overly light tone, saying that "There's little here that I would have picked for a horror movie."

A score soundtrack was also released, on April 19, 2011, by Varèse Sarabande. The Scream 4 score was yet again developed by Marco Beltrami. It received mixed reviews. Filmtracks stating that "Despite the memorable history Beltrami has afforded the franchise musically, Scream 4 is a substantially disappointing continuation of the narrative. He and four assistant composers handle the 2011 entry from a purely functional stance, tackling individual scenes with stylistic remnants of the previous scores while accomplishing absolutely nothing new." Soundtrack-review site Sountrackgeek gave the score a highly favorable review: "It is possibly the best score in the Scream series, because it is so incredibly forceful. It wants to be full of action and chills and it is. It's not the scariest of scores, but Scream has never been about the moody scares, but rather the surprise scare and crazy fight/chase scenes. It succeeds and I had a blast listening to this from start to finish."

Scream (2022) 

The original soundtrack for Scream (2022) was released on January 7, 2022, by Varèse Sarabande. On May 12, 2021, it was confirmed that Brian Tyler would score the soundtrack for the film. Tyler had previously worked with Matt Bettinelli-Olpin and Tyler Gillett on Ready or Not, and would be replacing Marco Beltrami, who composed the score for the previous four films.

Track listing:

Soundtrack 

The Scream (2022) soundtrack consists of 15 songs primarily of the pop, alternative, and hip-hop genres and featuring artists such as Kim Petras, DJ Khaled, and Santigold. The soundtrack received positive reviews, with Joséphine Michele of Screen Rant describing it as matching the tone of the Scream films perfectly while still feeling modern, saying "the movie itself takes heavy inspiration from the first film, but Scream (2022) ups the gore and violence, and the soundtrack brings it into the 2020s."

The fifth film's score soundtrack was released on January 7, 2022, by Varèse Sarabande. The score was developed by Brian Tyler, making it the first film in the franchise with a score that was not created by Marco Beltrami.

Scream VI (2023)
Scream VI was scored by Brian Tyler and Sven Faulconer. Tyler returned from the previous installment, and in January 2023, it was announced that Sven Faulconer joined to co-score the film.

Scream television series
Two official soundtrack albums for the Scream television series on MTV have been released. The first season's soundtrack was released on August 14, 2015, under Columbia Records. The second season's soundtrack was released on July 29, 2016, under Island Records. The score soundtrack for the series' first two seasons composed by Jeremy Zuckerman, was released by Lakeshore Records on October 28, 2016.

References

Scream (franchise)
Varèse Sarabande soundtracks
Lists of soundtracks
Scream